Rev. Peter James Bryant was pastor of Wheat Street Baptist Church in Atlanta, Georgia from 1898–1929.

Rev. Bryant spoke at the 1921 opening of Joyland Park, Atlanta's first amusement park for African Americans.

References

Southern Baptist ministers
People from Atlanta
Year of birth missing
Year of death missing